José Silva (5 April 1925 – 20 October 2018) was a Portuguese sailor. He competed in the Star event at the 1956 Summer Olympics.

References

External links
 

1925 births
2018 deaths
Portuguese male sailors (sport)
Olympic sailors of Portugal
Sailors at the 1956 Summer Olympics – Star
Place of birth missing